Jack Blackburn (born c.1919) was a professional rugby league footballer who played in the 1930s, 1940s and 1950s. He played at club level for Featherstone Rovers (Heritage № 180), as an occasional goal-kicking , i.e. number 2 or 5.

Playing career
Blackburn made his début for Featherstone Rovers on Saturday 16 December 1939, he appears to have scored no drop-goals (or field-goals as they are currently known in Australasia), but prior to the 1974–75 season all goals, whether; conversions, penalties, or drop-goals, scored 2-points, consequently prior to this date drop-goals were often not explicitly documented, therefore '0' drop-goals may indicate drop-goals not recorded, rather than no drop-goals scored. In addition, prior to the 1949–50 season, the archaic field-goal was also still a valid means of scoring points.

County Cup Final appearances
Blackburn played , i.e. number 5, in Featherstone Rovers' 12-9 victory over Wakefield Trinity in the 1939–40 Yorkshire County Cup Final during the 1939–40 season at Odsal Stadium, Bradford on Saturday 22 June 1940.

Testimonial match
Blackburn's benefit season at Featherstone Rovers, shared with Jimmy Russell, took place during the 1951–52 season.

References

External links

Search for "Blackburn" at rugbyleagueproject.org - No entry
A FEATHERSTONE ROVERS BLOG: Jackie Blackburn
A FEATHERSTONE ROVERS BLOG: June 2013
A FEATHERSTONE ROVERS BLOG: Jimmy Russell
A FEATHERSTONE ROVERS BLOG: Testimonials and Benefit Seasons.

English rugby league players
Featherstone Rovers players
Place of birth missing
Place of death missing
Rugby league wingers
Year of birth missing
Year of death missing